Speedy Hire plc, doing business as Speedy, is a provider of tools and equipment hire, based in the United Kingdom, and also provides services to the construction, infrastructure, industrial markets. The company was founded in Wigan in 1977, and now operates nationally across the United Kingdom and Ireland from over two hundred fixed sites, and in the oil and gas markets in the UAE and Kazakhstan.

References

External links

Official site

British companies established in 1977
Companies based in Merseyside
Companies listed on the London Stock Exchange
Construction equipment rental companies of the United Kingdom
Metropolitan Borough of St Helens